The Processo Revolucionário Em Curso (English: Ongoing Revolutionary Process) is the period of the history of Portugal from the Carnation Revolution on 25 April 1974 to the establishment of a new constitution and the legislative elections on 25 April 1976. The turbulent period saw a number of governing bodies.

Council of State
Portuguese Council of State, from 31 May 1974
 Citizens: Diogo de Freitas do Amaral, Henrique de Barros, Almeida Bruno, Isabel Magalhães Colcaco, Rafael Durão, Ruy Luis Gomes, Azeredo Perdigão
 National Salvation Junta (JSN): José Pinheiro de Azevedo, António Rosa Coutinho, Francisco da Costa Gomes, Jaime Silvério Marques, Carlos Galvão de Melo, Diogo Neto, António de Spínola
 Movimento das Forças Armadas (MFA): Vítor Alves^, Ernesto Melo Antunes, Almada Contreiras, Victor Crespo, Vasco Gonçalves^, Costa Martins^, Pereira Pinto
^ replaced in the second government by Vasco Lourenço, Franco Charais, Canto e Castro

Committee of Twenty
Committee of Twenty, from 28 September 1974
 Air Force: Canto e Castro, Pereira Pinto, Mendes Dias, Pinho Freire, Costa Martins
 Army: Franco Charais, Vasco Lourenço, P. Soares, Carlos Fabião, Francisco da Costa Gomes, F.L. Pires, Vítor Alves, Ernesto Melo Antunes, Vasco Gonçalves, Otelo S. Carvalho
 Navy: Almada Contreiras, Miguel Judas, José Pinheiro de Azevedo, António Rosa Coutinho, Victor Crespo

First Council of the Revolution
First Council of the Revolution, from 11 March 1975.
 Air Force: Canto e Castro, Graça Cunha, Mendes Dias, Pinho Freire, Costa Martins, Costa Neves, Pereira Pinto, Morais e Silva
 Army: Victor Alves, Melo Antunes, Otelo, Sousa e Castro, Franco Charais, Pezarat Correia, Corvacho, Carlos Fabião, Francisco Costa Gomes, Vasco Gonçalves, Marques Júnior, Vasco Lourenço, Macedo, Fisher L. Pires, Pinto Soares, Ferreira Sousa
 Navy: Pinheiro de Azevedo, Almada Contreiras, Ramiro Correia, Rosa Coutinho, Victor Crespo, Martins Guerreiro, Miguel Judas

Second Council of the Revolution
Second Council of the Revolution, from 5 September 1975
 Air Force: Canto e Castro, Graça Cunha, Pinho Freire, Costa Martins, Costa Neves, Pereira Pinto, Morais e Silva
 Army: Victor Alves, Melo Antunes, Otelo, Sousa e Castro, Franco Charais, Corvacho, Carlos Fabião, Francisco Costa Gomes, Vasco Gonçalves, Marques Júnior, Vasco Lourenço, Macedo, Ferreira Sousa, Pires Veloso
 Navy: Pinheiro de Azevedo, Almada Contreiras, Ramiro Correia, Rosa Coutinho, Victor Crespo, Martins Guerreiro, Felgueiras Soares

Third Council of the Revolution
Third Council of the Revolution, from 28 November 1975, following the Coup of 25 November 1975
 Air Force: Canto e Castro, Graça Cunha, Pinho Freire, Costa Neves, Morais da Silva, Ribeiro Cardoso
 Army: Melo Antunes, Otelo, Sousa e Castro, Franco Charais, Pezarat Correia, Ramalho Eanes, Carlos Fabião, Francisco Costa Gomes, Marques Júnior, Vasco Lourenço, Loureiro dos Santos, Pires Veloso, Rocha Vieira
 Navy: Pinheiro de Azevedo, Almada Contreiras, Ramiro Correia, Almeida e Costa, Rosa Coutinho, Victor Crespo, Souto Cruz, Martins Guerreiro, Miguel Judas, Felgueiras Soares

References

1970s in Portugal
Carnation Revolution